Diss is a market town and electoral ward in South Norfolk, England, near the boundary with Suffolk, with a population of 7,572 in 2011. Diss railway station is on the Great Eastern Main Line between London and Norwich.

History
The town's name is from dic, an Anglo-Saxon word meaning ditch or embankment. Diss has several historic buildings, including an early 14th-century parish church and an 1850s corn exchange still in use. Under Edward the Confessor, Diss was part of the Hartismere hundred of Suffolk, It was recorded as such in the 1086 Domesday book. It is recorded as being in the king's possession as demesne (direct ownership) of the Crown, there being at that time a church and a glebe of 24 acres (9.7 ha).

This was thought to be worth £15 per annum, which had doubled by the time of William the Conqueror to £30, with the benefit of the whole hundred and half belonging to it. From this it appears that it was still relatively small, but it soon grew, when it subsumed Watlingsete Manor, a neighbouring area as large as Diss, and seemingly more populated according to the geld or tax that it paid. This was afterwards called Walcote  and includes part of Heywode, as appears from its joining to Burston, into which the manor extended.

Diss was granted by King Henry I to Richard de Lucy, some time before 1135. The Testa de Neville finds it not known whether Diss was rendered to Richard de Lucy as an inheritance or for his service, but adds it was doubtless for the latter. Richard de Lucy become Chief Justiciar to King Stephen and Henry II. 

In 1152, Richard de Lucy received the right to hold a market in Diss, and before 1161 he gave a third of a hundred of Diss (Heywood or Hewode) together with the market in frank marriage with his daughter Dionisia to Sir Robert de Mountenay. After Richard de Lucy's death in 1179, the inheritance of the other two parts of Diss hundred passed to his daughter Maud, who married Walter FitzRobert.

The whole estate later fell to the Lordship of the FitzWalters, who were raised to Baron FitzWalter in 1295. In 1299, the then Lord FitzWalter obtained a charter of confirmation for a fair every year at his manor of Diss, to be held around the feast day of Saint Simon and Jude (28 October) and several days after. A grant made in 1298 to William Partekyn of Prilleston (now Billingford) presented for homage and half a mark of silver two homesteads in Diss, with liberty of washing his wool and cloths in Diss Meer. This came on the express condition that the gross dye be washed off first. It seems that Diss Church was built by the same Lord, as his arms appear in the stone of the south porch of the church several times.

Soon after the Battle of Agincourt in 1415, Edward Plantagenet, Duke of York and Earl of Rutland, came to hold Diss manor, hundred and market, together with Hemenhale, and the title of Lord FitzWalter became attached to the estate. It was part of a larger estate that included Hemenhale and Diss manors, with the hundred of Diss in Norfolk, the manors of Shimpling and Thorne in Suffolk, of Wodeham-Walter (now Woodham Walter), Henham, Leiden (now part of Leaden Roding), Vitring, Dunmow Parva (now Little Dunmow), Burnham (possibly the modern village of Burnham-on-Crouch), Winbush, and Shering (now Sheering) in Essex. Shortly afterwards, the estate was acquired by the Ratcliffe family, which inherited the title of Baron FitzWalter. The family owned the land until at least 1732, styling themselves Viscounts FitzWalter.

John Skelton, tutor and court poet to Henry VIII, was appointed rector at St. Mary's Church in Diss in about 1503. He retained the benefice until his death. Events there formed the subject of some of his poems, such as the humorous invective "Ware the Hauke", in which another priest goes falconing in St Mary's, barring the doors against him and causing chaos in the church.

Opposite the 14th-century parish Church of St Mary the Virgin stands a 16th-century building known as the Dolphin House. This was one of the town's major buildings, as its impressive dressed-oak beams denote. It may have been a wool merchant's house. Formerly a pub, the Dolphin, from the 1800s to the 1960s, the building now houses some small businesses.

Next to Dolphin House is the town's market place, the town's geographical and social centre. The market is held every Friday (except Good Friday and other holidays, when it is rescheduled to Thursday): a variety of local traders sell fresh fruit and vegetables, meat, fish and cheeses. It was first granted a charter by Richard the Lionheart. The town's post office and main shopping street, Mere Street, are also near the marketplace.

In March 2006, Diss became the third UK town to join Cittaslow, an international body promoting a concept of "Slow Towns". However, it has since withdrawn.

A railway journey from London to Diss forms the subject of a poem by Sir John Betjeman: "A Mind's Journey to Diss". He also made a short documentary film in 1964, entitled Something about Diss.

Religion
Diss has at least nine places of worship. They include the 13th-century Anglican parish church, the Catholic (St Henry Morse), and Methodist, Baptist and community churches.

Sport and activities
The town's sporting clubs include Diss Town FC and Diss RFC, based in nearby Roydon. Diss has produced national and international sports stars, three footballers (see Notable people), and the Great Britain judo team member Colin Oates, who attended Diss High School. The town has a squadron of Royal Air Force Air Cadets and a squadron of Army Cadets.

Notable people
In order of birth:
John Skelton (c. 1463–1529), poet, is thought to have been born here.
Thomas Jenkinson Woodward (1745–1820), botanist, died here.
Thomas Lord (1755–1832), founder of Lord's Cricket Ground, spent childhood here.
William Richard Basham (1804–1877), medical specialist in dropsy and renal disease, was born here.
John Goldworth Alger (1836–1907), journalist and writer on the French Revolution, was born here.
James Bickerton Fisher (1843–1910), solicitor and member of the New Zealand House of Representatives, was born here.
Catherine Engelhart Amyot (1845–1926), Danish portrait and genre painter, had three children born here (Thomas in 1879, Catherine Florence in 1880 and Noel Ethel in 1882).
Ethel Le Neve (1883–1967), mistress of the wife-murderer Hawley Harvey Crippen, was born here.
Elsie Vera Cole (1885–1967), painter and engraver, died here.
Doreen Wallace (1897–1989), novelist and agricultural writer, taught here in the 1920s and returned for her last eleven years.
Mary Wilson (1916–2018), centenarian wife of Prime Minister Harold Wilson, was born here.
Mervyn Cawston (born 1952), professional football goalkeeper, was born here.
Matthew Upson (born 1979), professional footballer for Arsenal F.C. and England, attended Diss High School.
Declan Rudd (born 1991), professional football goalkeeper, was born here.

References

Stephen Govier: An Illustrated History & Guide to Diss (2007)
wikisource:History of Norfolk/Volume 1/Diss

External links
Diss Town Council – official town council website
Norfolk: Diss GENUKI Norfolk transcript from History, Gazetteer, and Directory of Norfolk, William White, 1845

 
Towns in Norfolk
South Norfolk
Civil parishes in Norfolk